Capt. Simon Johnston House, also known as Kemp House, is a historic home located at Clayton in Jefferson County, New York.  It was built in 1880-1882 and is a -story frame Italianate style residence.  The main facade features an engaged central tower extending one story above a low pitched hipped roof.  The tower features a pagoda style roof.

It was listed on the National Register of Historic Places in 1982.

Gallery

References

External links

Houses on the National Register of Historic Places in New York (state)
Italianate architecture in New York (state)
Houses completed in 1882
Houses in Jefferson County, New York
National Register of Historic Places in Jefferson County, New York